Vimana is the second album by the Italian progressive/jazz rock group Nova, that was released by Arista Records in 1976.

Track listing

Personnel
Corrado Rustici - lead guitar, 6- and 12-string acoustic guitars, marimba, lead vocal
Elio D'Anna - tenor and soprano saxophones, flute, synthesiser on "The Princess and the Frog"  
Renato Rosset - Fender Rhodes piano, acoustic piano, mini moog, string ensemble clavinet
Percy Jones - bass guitar
Narada Michael Walden - drums, Fender Rhodes piano on "The Princess and the Frog"
Phil Collins - percussion
Zakir Hussain - congas

References

External links
 

1976 albums
Nova (Italian band) albums
Arista Records albums
albums recorded at Trident Studios